Rep is a 1982 British comedy television series starring Iain Cuthbertson, Stephen Lewis, Patsy Rowlands and John Fraser. Four episodes were produced for Granada Television.

References

External links

1980s British comedy television series
1982 British television series debuts
1982 British television series endings
British comedy television shows
ITV television dramas
Television series by ITV Studios
Television shows produced by Granada Television
English-language television shows